Mpu Gandring was a famous maker of kris, a type of Javanese knife.  He lived during the Kediri era and was killed by Ken Arok, who had commissioned a kris from Mpu Gandring. Impatient, Ken used the unfinished kris to murder the blacksmith. Mpu Gandring then cursed the kris: it would be destined to kill seven generations of Ken Arok's family, including his own life.
Gandring, Mpu
Gandring, Mpu